David Lawrence McCary (born July 2, 1985) is an American comedian, writer, and director. From 2013 to 2019, he served as a segment director for Saturday Night Live and was also the main director for the first two seasons of the popular web series Epic Rap Battles of History. During college he formed sketch comedy group Good Neighbor. He is married to actress Emma Stone, with whom he has a daughter.

Early life
McCary lived with his childhood friend Kyle Mooney while Mooney attended the University of Southern California but dropped out after his second year. It was there that McCary met future Good Neighbor members Nick Rutherford and Beck Bennett.

Career

Good Neighbor
In 2007, McCary came together with Kyle Mooney, Beck Bennett, and Nick Rutherford to form the sketch comedy group Good Neighbor. Prior to landing on SNL, Good Neighbor had just finished filming a Comedy Central pilot, The Good Neighbor Show, that was  produced by Will Ferrell and Adam McKay via their company Gary Sanchez. SNL reportedly had to work with Comedy Central to get them out of their contract so they could join the long-running sketch show. During this time, McCary directed the first two seasons of Epic Rap Battles of History.

Saturday Night Live
In 2013, McCary joined Saturday Night Live for its thirty-ninth season as a segment director along with Good Neighbor co-founders Kyle Mooney and Beck Bennett, who joined as featured players, and Nick Rutherford, who joined as a staff writer.

Brigsby Bear 
In 2017, McCary directed comedy-drama film Brigsby Bear produced by The Lonely Island. The film stars Kyle Mooney, Mark Hamill, Greg Kinnear, Matt Walsh, Michaela Watkins, Jorge Lendeborg Jr. and Ryan Simpkins. It premiered at the Sundance Film Festival on January 23, 2017, and was released on July 28, 2017, by Sony Pictures Classics.

In August 2020, McCary and his wife Emma Stone's production company, Fruit Tree Productions, signed a two-year first-look television deal with A24.

Personal life
McCary began dating actress Emma Stone in October 2017. McCary and Stone announced their engagement on December 4, 2019, and married the following year. In January 2021, it was reported that Stone was pregnant with their first child, who was born on March 13, 2021. McCary and Stone named their daughter Louise Jean McCary - a tribute to Stone's grandmother, Jean Louise; Jean is also Stone's middle name.

References

External links

1985 births
Living people
21st-century American comedians
21st-century American male writers
American male comedians
American television directors
American television writers
American male television writers
Comedians from California
Comedy film directors
Film directors from California
University of Southern California alumni
Writers from San Diego